Kim Hye-yong (born 26 November 1970) is a North Korean table tennis player. She competed in the women's singles event at the 1992 Summer Olympics.

References

External links
 

1970 births
Living people
North Korean female table tennis players
Olympic table tennis players of North Korea
Table tennis players at the 1992 Summer Olympics
Place of birth missing (living people)